Vladlen Naumenko (5 November 1947) is a former professional Soviet football midfielder and coach.

Honours
Football Championship of the Ukrainian SSR
 Winner (2): 1968 (Avanhard), 1974 (Sudnobudivnyk)

References

External links
 

1947 births
Living people
People from Orsha
Soviet footballers
Ukrainian footballers
FC Avanhard Ternopil players
MFC Mykolaiv players
FC Ordabasy players
FC Zvezda Tiraspol players
FC Krystal Kherson players
FC Zimbru Chișinău players
Soviet football managers
Ukrainian football managers
MFC Mykolaiv managers
Association football midfielders